Moose TV is a Canadian television sitcom, airing on Showcase in the 2007-2008 television season.

The series stars Adam Beach as George Keeshig, a Cree from the fictional community of Moose in northern Quebec, who returns home after a decade living in Toronto to become manager of the local community television station. The cast also includes Gary Farmer, Jennifer Podemski, Nathaniel Arcand, Michelle Latimer, Diane Flacks, and Billy Merasty. The series' head writer is Paul Quarrington. The series was directed by Tim Southam.

Produced by Rezolution Pictures for the Showcase network in Canada, the series received the Indie Award for Best Comedy Series from the Canadian Film and Television Producers Association in 2008.

References

External links

 Moose TV

Showcase (Canadian TV channel) original programming
2007 Canadian television series debuts
First Nations television series
Television series about television
2000s Canadian sitcoms
2000s Canadian workplace comedy television series